Nesoryzomys darwini, also known as Darwin's nesoryzomys or Darwin's Galápagos mouse, is a species of rodent in the genus Nesoryzomys that lived on Santa Cruz Island in the Galápagos Islands. It was probably nocturnal and inhabited burrows or rock crevices under bushes. Only four specimens exist, collected by Frank Wonder between 12 and 16 January 1929. This extinction may have been caused by competition and disease created by the introduction of nonnative brown and black rats.

The other Nesoryzomys known from Santa Cruz, Nesoryzomys indefessus, is also extinct there; other species of the genus survive on different islands.

References

Literature cited
Dowler, R.C., Carroll, D.S. and Edwards, C.W. 2000. Rediscovery of rodents (Genus Nesoryzomys) considered extinct in the Galápagos Islands. Oryx 34(2):109–118. ISSN 0030-6053
Duff, A. and Lawson, A. 2004. Mammals of the World: A checklist. New Haven, Connecticut: Yale University Press, 312 pp. 
Flannery, T. and Schouten, P. 2001. A Gap in Nature: Discovering the World's Extinct Animals. Atlantic Monthly Press, New York. 
Musser, G.G. and Carleton, M.D. 2005. Superfamily Muroidea. Pp. 894–1531 in Wilson, D.E. and Reeder, D.M. (eds.). Mammal Species of the World: a taxonomic and geographic reference. 3rd ed. Baltimore: The Johns Hopkins University Press, 2 vols., 2142 pp. 

Endemic fauna of the Galápagos Islands
Extinct rodents
Mammals of Ecuador
Rodent extinctions since 1500
Nesoryzomys
Extinct mammals of South America
Mammals described in 2008
Species made extinct by human activities